The Queenscliffe Historical Museum is a regional cultural history museum in the town of Queenscliff, Victoria, Australia. The museum is part of the Museum Accreditation Program (MAP).

Description 
The museum opened in 1974, specifically to house socially historical materials peculiar to the Borough of Queenscliffe (which includes Queenscliff, Point Lonsdale and Swan Island). The museum is home to many thousands of items including photographs, documents, paintings, newspapers, toys, and also a display of shipwreck relics recognised by Heritage Victoria.

A proposal and request for funding for the Queenscliff Cultural Hub that would combine the museum, Queenscliff Library, and Visitor Centre has been submitted.

The museum is managed by volunteers, including their president who was awarded an OAM in 2017

Main permanent exhibits 

The main permanent exhibits include
 People & Place: buildings, land owners, settlers, seascapes, streets, merchants
 Gov. Charles La Trobe: pioneers, house building, civic development, furnishings, domestic style
 Mayor D.J Williams: governance, Borough of Queenscliffe, community
 Coastal Life: beach scenes, lighthouses, boating, shopping, fishing, sea bathing, defence
 Shipwrecks: rip hazards, navigation, salvage, personal bravery
 Buildings: streetscapes, hotels, shops, piers, schools, churches, houses
 Holidays: guesthouses, entertainment, holiday homes, paddle steamers
 Personal Items: spectacles, sewing kits, purses, medals

Events 
Monthly Talks are held on the fourth Friday of every month, currently held at the Point Lonsdale Community Hall, Bowen Rd, Point Lonsdale . Topics range from significant people, places and events in the Borough of Queenscliffe and are presented by local historians.

History Week is in conjunction with the Royal Historical Society of Victoria the Queenscliffe Historical Museum participates in History Week. Events throughout the week in October range from guided tours, guest speakers and film showings

Research 
The museum's archive can be accessed by the public. The database houses thousands of documents, photographs and records of people, buildings and events.

Publications 
 Celebrating History... Items from the Queenscliffe Historical Museum Collection
The museum's 50th anniversary book was launched on 15 October 2017 by the Honorable Ted Ballieu

References

External links 
 

Bellarine Peninsula
Historical societies of Australia
Museums in Victoria (Australia)
History of Victoria (Australia)
Borough of Queenscliffe